Koppillil Radhakrishnan (born 29 August 1949) is an Indian space scientist who headed the Indian Space Research Organisation (ISRO) between November 2009 and December 2014 as Chairman of Space Commission, Secretary of the Department of Space and Chairman of ISRO. Prior to this, he was the Director of Vikram Sarabhai Space Centre (2007-2009) and Director of National Remote Sensing Agency (2005-2008) of the Department of Space. He had a brief stint of five years (2000-2005) in the Ministry of Earth Sciences as Director of Indian National Centre for Ocean Information Services (INCOIS).

Presently, he is the Chairperson of the Board of Governors of Indian Institute of Technology (IIT), Kanpur & Indian Institute of Technology (IIT), Ropar, and Chairman of the Standing Committee of the IIT Council;  Chairperson of the Oversight Committee of Science & Engineering Research Board (SERB-DST), and Chairman, High-powered Committee of Indian Knowledge Systems, Ministry of Education-Government of India  besides being a Member of Space Commission and Honorary Distinguished Advisor in the Department of Space/ISRO.

He is a Fellow of the Indian National Academy of Engineering; Fellow of the National Academy of Sciences, India; Honorary Life Fellow of the Institution of Engineers, India; Honorary Fellow of the Institution of Electronics and Telecommunication Engineers, India; Member of the International Academy of Astronautics; Distinguished Fellow of Astronautical Society of India; Fellow of the Andhra Pradesh Academy of Sciences; Honorary Fellow of the Kerala Academy of Sciences; Fellow of the Indian Society of Remote Sensing; and Fellow of the Indian Geophysical Union. He is an accomplished vocalist (Carnatic music) and Kathakali artist.

Penguin Random House India published his autobiography My Odyssey: Memoirs of the Man Behind the Mangalyaan Mission, co-authored by Radhakrishnan and Nilanjan Routh, in November 2016.

Education and personal life
Koppillil Radhakrishnan hails from Irinjalakuda in Thrissur district, Kerala. After his schooling at the National High School, Irinjalakuda, he did two-year Pre-degree studies (Mathematics, Physics, Chemistry) at Christ College, Irinjalakuda. He studied Electrical Engineering at the Government Engineering College, Thrissur and acquired BSc (Engg.) degree in First Class with Honours from Kerala University in 1970.  He did post-graduate studies in management at Indian Institute of Management Bangalore in 1974-76.  He obtained doctorate from the Indian Institute of Technology Kharagpur, in 2000, for the thesis : 'Some Strategies for the Management of Indian Earth Observation System'.

Radhakrishnan married Padmini Kizhakke Valappil from Irinjalakuda in 1983. Padmini worked with State Bank of Travancore from 1980 to 2010.

Indian Space Research Organisation
Radhakrishnan joined ISRO in May 1971 at the Space Science & Technology Centre at Thiruvananthapuram (the present Vikram Sarabhai Space Centre) as a design and development engineer of electro-mechanical devices.  Later he worked on system planning and technology management for avionics systems of SLV-3, ASLV and PSLV. During 1981-97, at the ISRO Headquarters, he oversaw the preparation and review of annual budgets of ISRO, formulation of decade profile and Five Year Plans for Indian Space programme and the related techno-economic analysis.

Remote Sensing Applications. 
As Project Director, he set up a chain of regional remote sensing service centres (RRSSC) at Bangalore, Nagpur, Kharagpur, Jodhpur and Dehradun for capacity building in central and state government agencies. While he was the Director,  RRSSCs came to prominence in the national remote sensing application missions including the Integrated Mission for Sustainable Development (IMSD)  aimed at generation of spatial database of natural resources and action plans for sustainable development of land and water resources.

Later, Radhakrishnan succeeded as the Mission Director of IMSD and moved to National Remote Sensing Agency in Hyderabad.  IMSD was considered as largest remote sensing application experiment ever done in the world using a meticulous participatory approach. As the Director of National Remote Sensing Agency, he scripted India’s modern multi-mission ground station for Earth Observation Satellites.

Space Transportation System and Chandrayaan-1 Mission 
While at Vikram Sarabhai Space Centre as its Director,  he oversaw five successful launches of PSLV including development of its high-end version PSLV –XL that lofted Chandrayaan-1 in October 2008 as well as formulation of Indian Human Spaceflight programme.

Chief of India's Space Programme 
As India's space chief from November 2009 to December 2014, Radhakrishnan led ISRO to achieve 37 space missions including several historic feats including Mars Orbiter Mission; flying Indian Cryogenic Engine on GSLV;  the first experimental flight of the GSLV Mk III; a re-entry experiment of an un-manned crew module; and new space capabilities through IRNSS (1A, 1B, 1C) for navigation; GSAT-7 for strategic communication; and RISAT-1 for microwave radar imaging. ISRO completed two joint satellite missions (Megha Tropiques and SARAL) with the French National Space Agency and inked another agreement with NASA to jointly build an advanced Radar Imaging Satellite. India's standing in the global space market was enhanced as PSLV launched 18 commercial satellites for 11 countries. Through an inclusive organisational process, Radhakrishnan charted out clear programmatic directions and nurtured younger generation of leaders for carrying forward the legacy of ISRO. Re-defining the Chandrayaan-2 mission with Indigenous lander and rover and extending the application of space technologies and tools to all central ministries are highlights of his leadership regime at ISRO. He worked to enhance the partnership with the Indian space industry for the production of operational launchers and satellites.

During his leadership, ISRO received the 2014 Gandhi Peace Prize; the 2014 Indira Gandhi Prize for Peace, Disarmament and Development; the 2014 Knowledge Economy Network KEN Award; the 2014 CNN-IBN Indian of the Year-Lifetime Achievement Award; the 2014 Global Game Changer Award by the Marico Innovation Foundation; and the 2013 CNBC-18 India Business Leader Award-BRAND INDIA.

Mars Orbiter Mission (Mangalyaan) 
Mars Orbiter Mission (MOM; aka Mangalyaan) was conceived, planned and executed, within four years (2010-2014), establishing India as the first country to have successful mission to Mars in its maiden attempt, and at significantly low cost (INR 4.5 Billion) .

Geosynchronous Satellite Launch Vehicle and Indian Cryogenic Stage 
GSLV had a checkered history in its initial flights of 2001-2007 and they were powered by cryogenic upper stage of Russia. After failure of the Indian Cryogenic upper stage on GSLV in April 2010 (GSLV-D3) and recurrence one more failure of GSLV with Russian Cryogeinc upper stage (GSLV-F06) in December 2010, Radhakrishnan steered ISRO towards the landmark success in January 2014 GSLV-D5.  This marked the beginning of the successful series of GSLV with Indian Cryogenic Upper Stage.

Ocean Observation and Information Services 
Radhakrishnan had a stint of five years the Ministry of Earth Sciences to set up, Indian National Centre for Ocean Information Services (INCOIS). In the aftermath of the Indian Ocean Tsunami disaster of December 2004, he emerged as the Project Director to set up the Indian Ocean Tsunami Warning Centre.

Kathakali and Carnatic Music 

Radhakrishnan is a Carnatic music and Kathakali enthusiast and performer. Radhakrishnan was drawn into the world of performing arts from childhood. After formal training in Kerala Natanam, under Professor Thrippunithura Vijayabhanu, he had training in Kathakali dance under Guru Pallippuram Gopalan Nair,  Kalanilayam Raghavan and Shri T.V.A Varier. Also, he was trained in Carnatic music by eminent musicians like Prof. Vechoor Harihara Subramania Iyer, Dr. R.K. Srikantan,  Dr. Nookala Chinna Satyanarayana; currently he is student of Vidwan R.S. Ramakanth. Dr. Radhakrishnan has performed at Bengaluru Sangeethotsav, Sankranthi Music Festival of RK Srikantan Trust, Swaralaya, Bangalore Centre for Kathakali and Arts, JSS Sangeetha Sabha, Chembai Vaidyanatha Bhagavathar Music Festival at Chennai. He has been singing at the Guruvayoor Chembai Sangeetholsavam every year since 2008.

Positions held
He has held several key positions in ISRO and was one of the key people behind India's Chandrayaan-1 moon mission. He has held the following positions:
 Project Director, Regional Remote Sensing Service Centres under the umbrella of National Natural Resources Management System (1987–1989)
 Director, Regional Remote Sensing Service Centres under the umbrella of National Natural Resources Management System (1989–1997)
 Director, Budget and Economic Analysis, Indian Space Research Organisation/Department of Space, Bangalore, India (1987–1997)
 National Mission Director, Integrated Mission for Sustainable Development and a Deputy Director of the National Remote Sensing Agency (1997–2000)
 Director, Indian National Centre for Ocean Information Services (2000–2005)
 Project Director, Indian Tsunami Warning System (2005)
 Vice Chairman - Intergovernmental Oceanographic Commission (IOC) of UNESCO (2001–2005)
 Founding Chairman, Indian Ocean Global Ocean Observing System (2001–2006)
 Regional Coordinator, Indian Ocean for the International Argo Project (2001–2005)
 Director, National Remote Sensing Agency, Department of Space (2005–2008)
 President, Indian Society of Remote Sensing (2005-2007)
 Vice President, Indian Geophysical Union (2007-2009)
 Member of the Indian delegation to the United Nations Committee on the Peaceful Uses of Outer Space (2006-2009)
 Director, Vikram Sarabhai Space Centre, Thiruvananthapuram, India (2007–2009)
 Member, Space Commission (2008-2009)
 Chairman, 'Working Group of the Whole' of S&T Sub-Committee of UN COPUOS (2008 & 2009)
 Chairman, Space Commission & Secretary, Department of Space
 Chairman, Indian Space Research Organisation, Bangalore, India (2009-2014)
 Chairman, Board of Antrix Corporation, Bangalore, India (November 2009-July 2011)
 Chairman, Indian Institute of Space Science and Technology, Thiruvananthapuram, India (2009-2014)
 Member, Planning Committee of National Natural Resources Management System (2009-2014)
 Chairman, NNRMS Standing Committee on Technology & Training (2009-2014)
 President, Astronautical Society of India (2010-2014)
 Member of CSIR Society and Member of CSIR Governing Council (2010-2013)
 Chairman, Research Council of National Aerospace Laboratory (2010-2013)
 Ex-officio Member of Scientific Advisory Committee to Prime Minister (2009-2014)
 Ex-officio Member of Scientific Advisory Committee to Cabinet (2009-2014)
 Chairman, Indian Institutes of Engineering Science and Technology, Shibpur, India (2014–2017)
 Adviser, Department of Space/Indian Space Research Organisation (2016 & 2017)
 Honorary Distinguished Adviser, Department of Space/Indian Space Research Organisation (March 2018 – present)
Chairman, Board of Management, Sant Longowal Institute of Engineering & Technology (present)
Chairperson, Board of Governors of Indian Institute of Technology, Kanpur (February 2019 – present)
Chairperson, Board of Governors of Indian Institute of Technology, Ropar 
Chairman, Standing Committee of the IIT Council (December 2019 – present)
Member, Space Commission (February 2022 – present)
Chairperson, Oversight Committee of Science & Engineering Research Board SERB-DST (May 2022 - present]
Chairman, High-powered Committee of Indian Knowledge Systems, Ministry of Education (October 2022 - present)
Chairman, Committee for strengthening the Assessment and Accreditation of Higher Educational Institutions, Ministry of Education (November 2022)

Major Awards and honours
 2014: Radhakrishnan received the Padma Bhushan Award for contribution to Science and Engineering, especially in the field of Space Science and Technology.
 2014: Named one of Nature ten "people who mattered" of 2014 on 18 December 2014, along with Radhika Nagpal, and others.
2003: K.R. Ramanathan Memorial Gold Medal of Indian Geophysical Union
2005: VASVIK Industrial Research Award
2006: Silver Jubilee Honour by Ministry of Earth Sciences
2008: BHASKARA Award of Indian Society of Remote Sensing
2008: Dr. Y. Nayudamma Memorial Award of the A.P Academy of Sciences
2009: Social Sciences Award of the International Academy of Astronautics
2010: Vikram Sarabhai Memorial Award of Indian Science Congress
2010: Distinguished Alumnus Award of IIT, Kharagpur
2010: Distinguished Alumnus Award of IIM, Bangalore
2014: ISRO's Lifetime Achievement Award
2014: The Allan D. Emil Award of International Astronautical Federation
2014: Ernst & Young Lifetime Achievement Award
2014: Technovation-Sarabhai Award of Indian Electronics & Semiconductor Association
2015: Lifetime Achievent Award of Union Bank of India
2015: Lifetime Outstanding Innovation Award Indore Management Association
2015: Bharat Asmita Vigyan Tantragyaan Shreshta
2015: P.C. Chandra Purashkar for Lifetime Achievement
2016: Lifetime Achievement Award, Engineers’ Forum, Nagpur
2017: Global Indian (Science) Award of Times Network
2018: Qimpro Platinum Standard 2018 (Business)

He has been conferred a doctorate by IIT Kharagpur and honorary doctorates by 12 Indian universities .

References

External links

1949 births
Living people
Malayali people
Scientists from Kerala
Kathakali exponents
People from Irinjalakuda
Indian aerospace engineers
Indian Space Research Organisation people
IIT Kharagpur alumni
Indian Institute of Management Bangalore alumni
Government Engineering College, Thrissur alumni
Recipients of the Padma Bhushan in science & engineering
Engineers from Kerala
Dancers from Kerala
Indian male dancers
20th-century Indian engineers
21st-century Indian engineers